The Whistlefield Inn is a Category C listed building in Whistlefield, Argyll and Bute, Scotland, about twelve miles northwest of Dunoon. Built in 1663, it was originally a drover's inn on the route between Strachur and Ardentinny. Today, it is an inn and restaurant.

The business came under new management in September 2018.

Gallery

See also
List of listed buildings in Dunoon And Kilmun

References

External links
The Whistlefield Inn's official website
Whistlefield Inn - Aerial View - ClickAndPray Photography, YouTube, 7 January, 2019

Hotels in Argyll and Bute
Listed hotels in Scotland
Pubs in Scotland
1663 establishments in Scotland
Category C listed buildings in Argyll and Bute
Hotels established in the 17th century